, also known as the Japan Future Party, was a Japanese political party, formed on 28 November 2012 by Governor of Shiga Prefecture Yukiko Kada and dissolved in May 2013.

Kada created the party as an alternative to the then-ruling  Democratic Party of Japan (DPJ) and the main opposition Liberal Democratic Party (LDP), and it quickly merged with former political runner Ichirō Ozawa's People's Life Party. It was the only political party which opposed nuclear power and the Trans-Pacific Strategic Economic Partnership. After a complete failure at the polls in the 16 December 2012 general election the party collapsed, and it officially dissolved in May 2013 to little public notice.

History
There were talks with Mayor of Nagoya Takashi Kawamura and former Agriculture Minister Masahiko Yamada to further merge the Tax Cuts Japan into the TPJ as a single party. Some of the members of Green Wind also hinted at an intention to join the TPJ as well.

The party's policy platform for the 2012 general election included the elimination of nuclear power by 2022 and freezing the government's plan to raise the sales tax.

It went into the election with 12 members in the upper house and 61 in the lower house, but performed poorly, with only nine members in the lower house being re-elected. The upper house members were not up for re-election.

Tensions grew within the party and on 29 December 2012 the Ozawa group split from the TPJ and formed the Life Party while suggesting continued cooperation between both parties. Tomoko Abe remained the only TPJ  diet member, meaning that the TPJ could not maintain official party status in the diet, which requires five members. Abe and Kada sounded out Green Wind, which had four diet members, over a possible merger, but the talks were not successful.

After the Shiga prefectural assembly passed a resolution requesting Kada to stop doubling as governor and the head of the TPJ, she resigned as head of the party on January 4, 2013.

The remnants of the TPJ were dissolved, and its assets folded into Green Wind, in May 2013 under a much more concessionary deal.

Presidents of TPJ

Election results

General election results

References

External links
Official website

2012 establishments in Japan
2013 disestablishments in Japan
Anti-nuclear organizations
Defunct political parties in Japan
Environmentalism in Japan
Political parties disestablished in 2013
Political parties established in 2012